Run for Your Life is a 2014 American a television drama film based on a true story for Lifetime. Meredith (Amy Smart) is a battered Canadian woman who flees Canada to escape her abusive husband. She settles in Seattle, but her now-remarried ex-husband finds her. To protect her children, she must choose between killing him herself, hiring someone to kill him, or disappearing with her children and assuming new identities. It is based on Katherine Kotaw's memoir Quicksand: One Woman’s Escape From the Husband Who Stalked Her. The movie shows the events and consequences based on both paths in parallel, with frequent scene switching between the paths.

Cast 
 Amy Smart	                as 	        Meredith Redmond
 Mark Humphrey	as 		Robert Redmond
 Aislyn Watson		as 		Amanda Redmond
 Genea Charpentier		as 		Isabel Beckman
 Lochlyn Munro		as 		Neal 
 Lisa Durupt		as 		Annabelle Redmond

References

External links

2014 television films
2014 films
2014 drama films
Films about dysfunctional families
Films set in Seattle
American drama television films
2010s English-language films
2010s American films